The 1960 NASCAR Grand National season was the 12th season of professional stock car racing in the United States. Emanuel Zervakis was disqualified upon post-race inspection for the April 17 race due to an oversized fuel tank. This would be the last disqualification of a driver who had won the race on the track until 2022.

Races

Final standings

Footnotes

References

External links
1960 NASCAR Grand National results

 

NASCAR Cup Series seasons